Jan Vondrák is a Czech applied mathematician and theoretical computer scientist. He is a professor of mathematics at Stanford University since 2015. He was a research staff member in the theory group at the IBM Almaden Research Center from 2009 to 2015. 

Vondrák completed a bachelor's degree in Physics (1995) and a M.S. (1999) and Ph.D. (2007) in Computer Science at Charles University under advisor Martin Loebl.  He met mathematician Maryam Mirzakhani in 2004 in Boston. Vondrák completed a Ph.D. in Applied Mathematics in 2005 at Massachusetts Institute of Technology under advisor Michel Goemans. He was a postdoctoral researcher in the theory group at Microsoft Research from 2005 to 2006. From 2006 to 2009, Vondrák was a postdoctoral teaching fellow at Princeton University. He married Mirzakhani in 2008 on a mountain in New Hampshire. They moved to California in 2009. Their daughter Anahita was born 2011. His late wife died of breast cancer in 2017.

References 

Living people
Year of birth missing (living people)
Place of birth missing (living people)
21st-century Czech mathematicians
Czech computer scientists
Applied mathematicians
Theoretical computer scientists
Charles University alumni
Massachusetts Institute of Technology alumni
Stanford University faculty
Czech emigrants to the United States